{{DISPLAYTITLE:Psi1 Lupi}}

 

Psi1 Lupi, which is Latinized from ψ1 Lupi, is a single star in the southern constellation of Lupus. It has a yellow-white hue and is faintly visible to the naked eye with an apparent visual magnitude of +4.66. The star is located at a distance of approximately 207 light years from the Sun based on parallax. It is drifting closer with a radial velocity of −23 km/s, and is predicted to come to within  in 2.8 million years.

This is an evolved giant star with a stellar classification of G8/K0 III. With the hydrogen exhausted at its core, the star has cooled and expanded to 11 times the radius of the Sun. It is a red clump giant, which indicates it is on the horizontal branch and is generating energy through core helium fusion. The star has an estimated 2.4 times the Sun's mass and is radiating 62 times the luminosity of the Sun from its photosphere at an effective temperature of 4,939 K.

The star is surrounded by a cold circumstellar envelope, hinted at by the anomaly of the small observed power of the doublet Mg II emission at 2800 angstrom. The absorption cores on the peaks of the emission profiles Mg II k and h are mainly of interstellar origin and only partly due to self-absorption in the star's chromosphere.

See also
ψ2 Lupi

References

G-type giants
K-type giants
Horizontal-branch stars
Lupus (constellation)
Lupi, Psi1
Durchmusterung objects
Lupi, 3
139521
076705
5820